Qarah Jeqqeh or Qareh Jaqqeh or Qareh Jeqqeh or Qarah Chaqqeh may refer to:
 Qarah Jeqqeh, North Khorasan
 Qarah Jeqqeh, Razavi Khorasan